Opera Maine - formally PORTopera - is a professional opera company founded in 1994 by [a group of opera lovers including Bruce Hangen, Jack Riddle, Russ Burleigh, Dona D. Vaughn and others.] and based in Portland, Maine, although some of its productions travel within the state.  Its name derives from "Portland Opera Repertory Theatre" (PORT).  The principal company presents one, or occasionally up to three, operas each summer, and its adjunct Maine Emerging Artists Young Artists Program, founded in 1996, generally presents one more on a smaller scale.

Hangen served as PORTopera's Artistic Director until 2002; his successor, Dona D. Vaughn, has held that position ever since.  The company made its home at Portland's State Theater until moving to Merrill Auditorium in 1997.  Besides Hangen, who before founding the company had led the Portland and Omaha Symphony Orchestras, conductors who have worked with PORTopera include guests Giovanni Reggioli and Stephen Lord and present conductor Robert Moody.  Among singers who have performed with the company are New Englanders Mary Dunleavy and Kate Aldrich; the latter, who appeared in the title role of Bizet's Carmen in 2005, was the first Maine native to fill a principal role in one of the company's major productions.

Repertoire
The company's initial offering, in July 1995, was a production of Carmen with Donna Ames and Adam Klein as Carmen and Don José. However, since then, PORTopera has presented relatively little French opera, concentrating instead on Italian literature, including three operas in Italian by Mozart.  From the German repertoire, PORTopera has offered only Mozart's Der Schauspieldirektor, and its sole offering by a composer associated with America was Gian Carlo Menotti's The Medium, both performed at the Merill Auditorium in 2000.  The Young Artists have presented two rarities to punctuate a list of otherwise predominantly standard repertoire works: Bizet's Dr. Miracle in 2002 and Mozart's L'Oca del Cairo in 2006.

References

Other resources
"'Don Giovanni' may elicit a gasp or two; PORTopera stages Mozart's dramatic comedy with a lusty edge" by Bob Keyes, July 23, 2006 Portland Press Herald
"Bring the kids: PORTopera will get divas started young," The Maine Switch

American opera companies
Culture of Portland, Maine
Musical groups established in 1994
Performing arts in Maine